Brachaelurus (blind sharks) is the sole genus of sharks in the family Brachaeluridae in the order Orectolobiformes.

They are distinguished by the presence of long barbels, large spiracles, and a groove around the nostrils.  They have two dorsal fins, placed close together on the back, and a relatively short tail. Blind sharks have fully functioning eyes, but their name was given to them because when caught by anglers these eyes are closed (probably to protect them).

Blind sharks feed on small fish, cuttlefish, sea anemones, and crustaceans. The female retains the eggs in her body until they hatch (ovoviviparity), during which time the embryos feed solely on the egg yolk.

Species
Two species in this genus are recognized:
 Brachaelurus colcloughi Ogilby, 1908 (bluegrey carpetshark) 
 Brachaelurus waddi Bloch & J. G. Schneider, 1801 (blind shark)

In aquaria
Both the blind shark and the Coclough's shark have been successfully kept in home aquaria. In captivity, they can live to be 20 years old. They are well suited  because of their small adult sizes and "predilection for tight spaces". However, they are inactive during the daytime and spend most of the daylight hours hiding in artificial caves. Brachaelurids have been successfully reared in home aquaria on diets of fresh and frozen seafood fed three times weekly. Waters at 64-76 °F have been found to be most conducive to the health of these fish. Brachaelurids have been known to consume any of their tankmates that can be successfully swallowed. Blind sharks have been induced to breed in captivity. The Sydney Aquarium has successfully maintained an entire breeding colony of blind sharks.

References

Brachaeluridae
Shark genera
 
Toarcian first appearances
Extant Early Jurassic first appearances
Taxa named by James Douglas Ogilby